Clwb Pêl Droed Y Felinheli  is a Welsh football team based in the village of Y Felinheli (formerly known in English as Port Dinorwic), Gwynedd, Wales. They play in the Ardal Leagues North West, which is in the third tier of the Welsh football league system.

History
The current club was founded on 3 July 1977 as Portdinorwic Football Club, but there is evidence of teams in the village in 1890s, 1920s and 1930s. A club called Port Dinorwic won the Caernarfon & District League's Alves Cup in 1945–46. A team called Portdinorwic Football Club also played in the Caernarfon & District League for two seasons in the 1960s and used the same ground as the current club.

Honours
Welsh Alliance League – Runners-up: 1991–92
Welsh Alliance League Division Two – Champions: 2019–20
Gwynedd League – Champions: 1983–84; 2000–01; 2015–16
Caernarfon & District League – Champions: 1981–82; 1982–83; 2013–14
North Wales Coast Challenge Cup – Winners: 1987–88
North Wales Coast Challenge Cup – Runners-up: 1988–89; 1989–90
Caernarfon & District League Alves Cup – Winners: 1991–92
North Wales Coast FA Junior Challenge Cup – Winners: 2012–13; 2013–14
Llun Mewn Ffram  – Winners: 2013–14
Gwynedd League Cup – Winners: 2015–16

References

External links

Football clubs in Wales
Gwynedd League clubs
Welsh Alliance League clubs
1977 establishments in Wales
Sport in Gwynedd
Association football clubs established in 1977
Ardal Leagues clubs
Caernarfon & District League clubs